HD 48099 is a spectroscopic binary  in the constellation Monoceros where both components are massive and luminous O stars.

Binary stars offer the opportunity to directly measure the mass of each component, but in the case the orbital inclination is very low and the masses cannot be accurately determined.  The stars are orbiting extremely close together, separated only by about the diameters of the stars themselves.  They complete one orbit in just over three days.

Although HD 48099 only has a moderate space velocity of 37.7 km/s, it has produced a bow shock 2.26 parsecs from the star itself.

References

Monoceros (constellation)
048099
O-type main-sequence stars
2467
Spectroscopic binaries
Durchmusterung objects
032067
Emission-line stars
Monocerotis, 66